Oktoberfest may refer to:
 Oktoberfest
 Oktoberfest celebrations
 Oktoberfest – La Crosse, Wisconsin
 Oktoberfest Zinzinnati
 Oktoberfest of Blumenau
 Kitchener–Waterloo Oktoberfest
 Oktoberfest tents
 Oktoberfest terror attack

Films 
 Oktoberfest (1987 film), a Yugoslav 1987 drama directed by Dragan Kresoja about a young man and his unemployed friends' experiences from the Munich beer festival
 , a German crime film from 2005 directed by Johannes Brunner about Munich's Oktoberfest

See also